Arivaca pimella is a species of snout moth described by Harrison Gray Dyar Jr. in 1906. It is found in the US in southern Arizona.

The length of the forewings is about 13 mm. The forewings are sprinkled with brown and white anterior to the cell. The cell is brownish white. The hindwings are light brown in females and somewhat darker in males.

References

Moths described in 1906
Anerastiini
Moths of North America